Chinedu "Chin" Achebe (born September 7, 1977) is a former American football fullback / linebacker who played college football at Iowa State. He attended Steubenville Catholic Central High School. As a senior, he won the Ohio state wrestling championship at 215 pounds. Achebe also played baseball, where he earned 2 varsity letters 

He played in Arena Football League with the Iowa Barnstormers (2000), and the New York Dragons (2001-2005).
Achebe was the 19th selection of the Utah Blaze expansion draft.

References

1977 births
Sportspeople from Steubenville, Ohio
Players of American football from Ohio
American football linebackers
American football fullbacks
New York Dragons players
Iowa Barnstormers players
Iowa State Cyclones football players
Utah Blaze players
Living people